Looff Carousels are carousels built by Charles I. D. Looff (1852 - 1918) a master carver and builder of hand-carved carousels and amusement rides in America. Looff, whose factory was based in Riverside, Rhode Island, is credited with making about forty carousels between 1876 and 1916, only about ten of which survive.

Loof Carousels are known for their lavish decoration, including animals with real horse hair tails, elaborate gold and silver highlights, and sparkling mirrors and jewels.

Surviving examples include:

 Seaport Village in San Diego, California
 Children's Creativity Museum Looff Carousel, San Francisco, California
 Santa Cruz Looff Carousel, California
 Crescent Park Looff Carousel, East Providence, Rhode Island
 Pawtucket Looff Carousel, Slater Park, Pawtucket, Rhode Island
 Riverfront Park Carousel, Spokane, Washington
 Eldridge Park, Elmira, New York
 Heritage Museums and Gardens, Sandwich, Massachusetts
 Carousel of Happiness, Nederland, Colorado (mechanical components only)
 Woodbine Fantasy Fair in Ontario, Canada

References

Carousels